

Joseph Amadee Goguen (June 28, 1941 – July 3, 2006) was an American computer scientist. He was professor of Computer Science at the University of California and University of Oxford, and held research positions at IBM and SRI International.

In the 1960s, along with Lotfi Zadeh, Goguen was one of the earliest researchers in fuzzy logic and made profound contributions to fuzzy set theory.
In the 1970s Goguen's work was one of the earliest approaches to the algebraic characterisation of abstract data types and he originated and helped develop the OBJ family of programming languages. He was author of A Categorical Manifesto and founder and Editor-in-Chief of the Journal of Consciousness Studies. His development of institution theory impacted the field of universal logic. Standard implication in product fuzzy logic is often called "Goguen implication". Goguen categories are named after him.

He was married to Ryoko Amadee Goguen, who is a composer, pianist, and vocalist.

Education and academic career
Goguen received his bachelor's degree in mathematics from Harvard University in 1963, and his PhD in mathematics from the University of California, Berkeley in 1968, where he was a student of the founder of fuzzy set theory, Lotfi Zadeh.

He taught at UC Berkeley, the University of Chicago and University of California, Los Angeles, where he was a full professor of computer science. He held a Research Fellowship in the Mathematical Sciences at the IBM Watson Research Center, where he organised the "ADJ" group.  He also visited the University of Edinburgh in Scotland on three Senior Visiting Fellowships.

From 1979 to 1988, Goguen worked at SRI International in Menlo Park, California.  From 1988 to 1996, he was a professor at the Oxford University Computing Laboratory (now the Department of Computer Science, University of Oxford) in England and a Fellow at St Anne's College, Oxford. In 1996 he became professor of Computer Science at the University of California, San Diego.

Research areas
Goguen's research interests included category theory (a branch of mathematics), software engineering, fuzzy logic, algebraic semantics, user interface design, algebraic semiotics, and the social and ethical aspects of science and technology.
In the preface to a book dedicated to Goguen, Futatsugi, Jouannaud 
and Meseguer stated that Goguen's work changed the way we think about concepts such as data types,
programming languages and software specification.

In a review of Goguen's work on fuzzy sets Radim Belohlavek wrote that
In the early stages of the development of fuzzy systems, Goguen made profound contributions with 
lasting influence. 
Lotfi Zadeh viewed Goguen's 1968 approach to "The Logic of Inexact Concepts" as seminal in the field of fuzzy logic. Goguen's PhD dissertation "Categories of fuzzy sets" was the first work to apply category theory to fuzzy logic, and led to Goguen categories being named after him.

Goguen's research in the 1970s was one of the earliest approaches to the characterisation of computational automata from a categorical perspective. Goguen's research with Thatcher, Wagner and Wright (also in the 1970s) was one of the earliest works to formalise the algebraic basis for data abstraction.

In the early 1990s Goguen and Rod Burstall developed the theory of institutions, a category-theoretic description of logical systems in computer science. Institution theory impacted the development of universal logic and became one of its most studied aspects. The term "Carnapian Goguenism" is used to refer to the application of institutions to ontologies.

Goguen also studied the philosophy of computation and information, formal methods (especially hidden algebra and theorem proving), and relational and functional programming. He wrote a retrospective of his work and its context, Tossing Algebraic Flowers Down the Great Divide.

Personal views
Goguen was a practitioner of Tibetan Buddhism. Specifically, since the early 1970s he was a student of Chögyam Trungpa and, after his death in 1987, of his son Sakyong Mipham. During the late 1970s and early 1980s, he was a faculty member of the science program at the Naropa Institute in Boulder, Colorado.

Books
 Goguen, Joseph A., Algebraic Semantics of Imperative Programs, MIT Press (1996). . 
 Goguen, Joseph A., and Malcolm, Grant, Software Engineering with OBJ, Springer (2000). .
 Kokichi Futatsugi et al., Algebra, Meaning, and Computation: Essays Dedicated to Joseph A. Goguen, Springer (2006).  .

Selected publications
 Goguen, J.A., "L-fuzzy sets", Journal of Mathematical Analysis and Applications 18 (1): 145–174 (1967).
 Goguen, J.A., "The logic of inexact concepts", Synthese 19 (3/4): 325–373 (1969).
 Goguen, J.A. and J.W. Thatcher. "Initial algebra semantics", in Proceedings, Fifteenth Symposium on Switching and Automata Theory, IEEE, pages 63–77 (1974).
 Goguen, J.A., J. Thatcher, and E. Wagner. "An initial algebra approach to the specification, correctness and implementation of abstract data types", in Current Trends in Programming Methodology, vol. IV: Data Structuring, Raymond T. Yeh (Ed.), Prentice Hall, pp. 80–149 (1978).
 Goguen, J.A., "A Categorical Manifesto", Mathematical Structures in Computer Science 1 (1): 49–67 (1991).
 Goguen, J.A. (Ed.), Art and the Brain, Journal of Consciousness Studies 6 (6/7) (1999).

See also 
 List of computer scientists

References

External links 
 Home page
 Biographical information
 Publications
 
 Algebra, Meaning, and Computation. A Festschrift in Honor of Joseph Goguen
 Reviews of the first issues of the Journal of Consciousness Studies
 Photograph

1941 births
2006 deaths
Harvard College alumni
University of California, Berkeley alumni
American computer scientists
Formal methods people
Fellows of St Anne's College, Oxford
Academic journal editors
University of California, Los Angeles faculty
Academics of the University of Edinburgh
Members of the Department of Computer Science, University of Oxford
University of California, San Diego faculty
Naropa University faculty
IBM Fellows
American Buddhists